Dangerous Twins is a 2004 Nigerian drama film written, produced and directed by Tade Ogidan.
The film, which stars Bimbo Akintola, Ramsey Nouah and Stella Damasus-Aboderin is a 135 minutes, three-part film that won the 1st Africa Movie Academy Awards for Best Special Effects.

Ramsey Nouah played a dual role, as Taiye and Kenny in the film.

Plot summary
The film narrates the story of identical twins, Taiye and Kehinde (Ramsey Nouah). Kehinde is based in Lagos with his wife, (Stella Damasus) and his three children, while Taiye is based in London. The agony of a marriage without children, after several years frustrates Taiye, who convinces Kehinde to trade places with him in order to impregnate his wife. However, more problems result. 
Kehinde betrays his twin brother's trust and violence follows.

Production
The film was produced in Nigeria by OGD Pictures Production but shot in a foreign context in multiple locations, including Nigeria, London, France, Switzerland, the Netherlands, Belgium and United States of America.

Cast
Ramsey Nouah
Stella Damasus-Aboderin
Bimbo Akintola
Sola Asedeko
Nobert Young
Sola Sobowale
Anna Fiertag

References 

Nigerian drama films
2004 films
2004 drama films
Films shot in London
Films shot in Lagos
Films about twin brothers
2000s English-language films
English-language Nigerian films